The Slav Defense is a chess opening that begins with the moves: 
1. d4 d5
2. c4 c6

The Slav is one of the primary defenses to the Queen's Gambit. Although it was analyzed as early as 1590, it was not until the 1920s that it started to be explored extensively, although Steinitz essayed it in the first official World Chess Championship of 1886. Many masters of Slavic descent helped develop the theory of this opening, including Alapin, Alekhine, Bogoljubov, and Vidmar.

The Slav received an exhaustive test during the two Alekhine–Euwe World Championship matches in 1935 and 1937. Played by 11 of the first 13 world champions, this defense was particularly favored by Euwe, Botvinnik, and Smyslov. More recently the Slav has been adopted by Anand, Ivanchuk, Lautier, Short, and other top grandmasters, including use in six of the eight games that Vladimir Kramnik played as Black in the 2006 World Championship (in the other two, he played the related Semi-Slav Defense).

Today the theory of the Slav is very extensive and well-developed.

General considerations
There are three main variations of the Slav:
 The "Pure" Slav or Main Line Slav where Black attempts to develop the light-squared bishop to f5 or g4. 
 The a6 Slav or Chebanenko Slav with 4...a6.
 The Semi-Slav with ...e6 (without developing the light-squared bishop). The Semi-Slav Defense, a kind of a combination Queen's Gambit Declined and Slav Defense, is a very complex opening in its own right.
 There is also a lesser option, the Schlechter Slav with ...g6

Black faces two major problems in many variations of the Queen's Gambit Declined (QGD):
 Development of his  is difficult, as it is often blocked by a black pawn on e6.

The "Pure" Slav and a6 Slav address these problems. Black's queen bishop is unblocked; the pawn structure remains balanced. Also, if Black later takes the gambit pawn with ...dxc4, the support provided by the pawn on c6 (and possibly ...a6) allows ...b5 which may threaten to keep the pawn, or drive away a white piece that has captured it, gaining Black a tempo for queenside expansion. On the other hand, Black usually will not be able to develop the queen bishop without first giving up the center with ...dxc4, developing the bishop may leave the black queenside weak, and the thematic break ...c5 incurs the loss of a tempo.

The Slav can be entered by many move orders. The possibilities include 1.d4 d5 2.Nf3 Nf6 3.c4 c6, 1.Nf3 d5 2.c4 c6 3.d4 Nf6, and so on.

Alternatives to 3.Nf3
The main line is 3.Nf3. White can also try the following alternatives:

3.e3
Black often plays 3...Nf6 but 3...Bf5 is considered to be an easier equalizer. Also, 3...Nf6 4.Nc3 (same as 3.Nc3 Nf6 4.e3 below) may give Black some move-order issues for those wanting to play the "Pure" Slav and not the Semi-Slav or ...a6 Slav.

Exchange Slav: 3.cxd5 
The Exchange Variation was once described as "the system that takes the fun out of playing the Slav" for Black. After 3.cxd5 cxd5, the symmetrical position offers White only the advantage of the extra move, but the  position offers Black little chance to win unless White is overly ambitious. The rooks will often be exchanged down the now open c-file. This line is often used as a drawing weapon and if both players want to draw, they can play the symmetrical line, which continues 3...cxd5 4.Nf3 Nf6 5.Nc3 Nc6 6.Bf4 Bf5, resulting in a totally symmetrical position where every piece is developed to a good square. To avoid the possibility of the Exchange Slav Black often chooses the move order 2...e6 followed by 3...c6 to enter the Semi-Slav.

3.Nc3
The pressure on Black's center prevents 3...Bf5? since after 4.cxd5 cxd5 5.Qb3 White wins a pawn. Black can try the Winawer Countergambit, 3...e5, which was introduced in Marshall–Winawer, Monte Carlo 1901 but this is thought to be slightly better for White. The most common continuation is 3...Nf6 when 4.Nf3 transposes to the main line. White can also play 4.e3 when it was thought Black could no longer play the "Pure" Slav with 4...Bf5 (and had to choose between 4...e6 or 4...a6) due to 5.cxd5 cxd5 6.Qb3. Therefore, "Pure" Slav players sometimes meet 3.Nc3 with 3...dxc4, the Argentinian Defense, which can transpose to the main line of the "Pure" Slav. Recently the Gambit 4...Bf5 5.cxd5 cxd5 6.Qb3 Nc6 7.Qxb7 Bd7 has revitalized 4...Bf5.

3.Nf3 introduction
Black usually plays 3...Nf6. 3...e6 may lead to various possibilities, such as the Noteboom Variation, Semi-Slav Defense or Stonewall Dutch. 3...Bf5? is a mistake due to 4.cxd5 cxd5 5.Qb3, where black must play 5...Bc8 to avoid losing the b-pawn. Attempts such as 5...b6? fail due to e.g 6.Bg5 e6 7.e4! dxe4 8.Bb5+ Nbd7 9. Ne5 with 10.Bxf6 to follow.

Alternatives to 4.Nc3
After 3...Nf6, the main line is 4.Nc3. White can also try the following alternatives:

4.Qc2 or 4.Qb3
A line that is similar to the Catalan Opening is 4.Qc2 or 4.Qb3. Often, White will fianchetto his light-square bishop. This has the disadvantage of White's queen being somewhat exposed on c2. Black can meet 4.Qc2 with 4...g6, intending 5...Bf5. White usually plays 5.Bf4 so that after 5...Bf5 6.Qb3 Qb6 White can play 7.c5! Black has to play 7...Qxb3, which will be met by 8.axb3. White has a moderate advantage in this queenless middlegame, as White can expand on the queenside and try to create play on the queenside, but Black's position is solid. The most common continuations are 4...dxc4 5.Qxc4 Bf5 or 5...Bg4.

4.g3
Another Catalan style approach is 4.g3.

Slow Slav: 4.e3 
White can avoid the complexities of the main line 4.Nc3 by playing 4.e3. The most common continuation is 4...Bf5 5.Nc3 e6 6.Nh4, when White wins the bishop pair but Black gets a solid position and often gets counterplay with ...e5. This line was tested several times in the 2006 World Chess Championship. Alternatively, 5.cxd5 cxd5 6.Qb3 Qc7 is fine for Black.  White will try to take advantage of the absence of Black's queen bishop on the queenside, but this isn't enough to gain an advantage if Black plays accurately. Another way to play is 4...Bg4.

4.Nc3 introduction
Black should not play 4...Bf5 because White will gain the advantage with either 5.Qb3 or 5.cxd5 followed by 6.Qb3. Traditionally Black had a choice between 4...e6, the Semi-Slav, and 4...dxc4 before developing the queen bishop, but in the 1990s 4...a6 was introduced, with the idea of developing the queenside without locking in the queen bishop or conceding the center.

a6 (Chebanenko) Slav: 4...a6 
The a6 Slav occurs after 4...a6. Black seeks an early b5, either before or after capturing at c4.

White can achieve an important space advantage with 5.c5.  Both e5 and b6 become important pawn breaks for Black.  White will often play his bishop to f4, controlling the important dark squares e5, d6, c7, and b8 (this last square reduces Black's control over the b-file should it open).  The game can continue 5...Bf5 6.Bf4 Nbd7 7.e3 Nh5!.

4...dxc4 – alternatives to 5.a4
After 4...dxc4, the main line is 5.a4. White can also try the following alternatives

Slav Geller Gambit: 5.e4 
White's sharpest try against 4...dxc4 is the Slav Geller Gambit, 5.e4. Play usually continues 5...b5 6.e5 Nd5 7.a4 e6, but it is unclear whether the attack is strong enough for the sacrificed pawn. Evaluation of this line changes as improvements are found, but as of 2005 it is generally thought to favor Black.

White maintains the pawn with 5.e3
5.e3 is a solid choice known as the Alekhine Variation. Play can proceed 5...b5 6.a4 b4
 7.Na2 e6 8.Bxc4 
 7.Nb1 Ba6 8.Nbd2 c3 9.bxc3 Bxf1 10.Nxf1 bxc3

Alapin Variation: 5.a4; alternatives to 5...Bf5 
With 5.a4, White acts against ...b5 and prepares 6.e4 and 7.Bxc4. Black's main move is 5...Bf5. Black can also try the following alternatives:

Steiner Variation: 5...Bg4 
In the Steiner Variation (also called the Bronstein Variation), 5...Bg4, White may be discouraged from e4 by the possibility 6.e4 e5. More often the game continues 6.Ne5 Bh5.

Smyslov Variation: 5...Na6  
With the Smyslov Variation, 5...Na6, Black allows the e-pawn to come to e4 but can gain counterplay by ...Bg4 and perhaps bringing the knight to b4 e.g. 6.e4 Bg4 7.Bxc4 e6 8.0-0 Nb4.

Soultanbéieff Variation: 5...e6

Main line, Czech Variation: 5...Bf5 
The Czech Variation can be considered the main line. With 5...Bf5, Black prevents 6.e4.

Bled Attack: 6.Nh4

Dutch Variation: 6.e3 
If White plays 6.e3, the Dutch Variation, play can continue 6...e6 7.Bxc4 Bb4 8.0-0 0-0 with a fairly quiet game. Black can also play 6...Na6 with the idea of 7...Nb4, known as the Dutch, Lasker Variation.

Krause Attack: 6.Ne5 
A more energetic line begins 6.Ne5 (Krause Attack) where White intends f2–f3 and e2–e4 or Nxc4, perhaps followed by a fianchetto of the king bishop with g2–g3 and Bg2. Black can try either 6...Nbd7 7.Nxc4 Qc7 8.g3 e5 (known as the Carlsbad Variation) or 7...Nb6 or 6...e6 7.f3 Bb4, when 8.e4 Bxe4 9.fxe4 Nxe4 is a complex piece sacrifice with the semi-forced continuation 10.Bd2 Qxd4 11.Nxe4 Qxe4+ 12.Qe2 Bxd2+ 13.Kxd2 Qd5+ 14.Kc2 Na6. White can also play 10.Qf3 and force a draw.

Notes

References

Chess openings
16th century in chess